Kingsley Schindler (born 12 July 1993) is a German professional footballer who plays as a midfielder for Bundesliga club 1. FC Köln.

Career
Schindler spent his youth career at SC Concordia, Hannover 96 and TSG Neustrelitz. In 2013, he transferred to 1899 Hoffenheim II, where he competed in the Regionalliga Südwest. From 2016, he played for Holstein Kiel. The club achieved promotion to the 2. Bundesliga in 2017, leading to Schindler's breakthrough as a professional footballer.

In January 2019, it was announced that Schindler would leave Kiel after the season and sign a contract until 2023 with 1. FC Köln who achieved promotion to the Bundesliga later that season.

In August 2020, Schindler was loaned to Hannover 96 for one year.

References

External links
 

Living people
1993 births
Footballers from Hamburg
Association football midfielders
German footballers
Ghanaian footballers
German sportspeople of Ghanaian descent
SC Concordia von 1907 players
TSG Neustrelitz players
TSG 1899 Hoffenheim II players
Holstein Kiel players
1. FC Köln players
Hannover 96 players
3. Liga players
2. Bundesliga players
Bundesliga players